Vinež is a village in the Town of Labin in Istria County, Croatia.

References

Populated places in Istria County